Ratiba Hassnaoui (born 4 March 1987) is an Algerian handball player for HBC El Biar and the Algerian national team.

References

1987 births
Living people
Algerian female handball players
21st-century Algerian people